Tobias Preisig  (born September 18, 1981 in Zurich) is a Swiss violinist and composer. His style can be described as alternative jazz or experimental improvised jazz.

He plays mainly with his electronica duo Egopusher.

Tobias Preisig Quartet 

The quartet formed in 2009 with pianist Stefan Aeby, bass player André Pousaz, and drummer Michi Stulz. Two albums have been released since then: In Transit (Traumton) in 2012 and Flowing Mood, (ObliqSound) in 2010. The band toured through Switzerland, France, Austria, Germany, Japan, and China, playing at festivals such as the Cully Jazz Festival, Hamburg's Überjazz, Basel's Offbeat, Jazz Festival Schaffhausen, Altstadtherbst Düsseldorf, JZ Festival Shanghai.

Awards
 Pro Helvetia High Priority Jazz Promotion, 2013
 Cultural grant from the city of Zurich, 2012
 Cultural grant from the canton of Appenzell, 2005
 Generations Frauenfeld, 1998

Discography
 In Transit (Traumton, 2012)
 Flowing Mood (ObliqSound, 2010)

References

External links
 Lucerne University of Applied Sciences and Arts

 Tobias Preisig official website
 Tobias Preisig official japanese website
All About Jazz
Weltwoche, Der erste Schrei, der letzte Seufzer, March 2012 (in German)
Bill Milkowski,  JazzTimes „Swiss violinist Tobias Preisig and his quartet of rising stars from Zurich turn in an evocative program that ranges from chamberlike delicacy to darkly atmospheric ECM-ish fare to dynamic bursts of intensity.“

1981 births
Swiss composers
Swiss male composers
Musicians from Zürich
Living people